Fernando Jorge Lima de Moraes (born 21 January 1980), commonly referred to as Fernando, is a retired soccer player who last played for South Melbourne in the Victorian Premier League. Born in Brazil, he played for the Australia national futsal team.

Career
Fernando de Moraes initially specialised in futsal while playing in Brazil, and played his first match in the outdoor version of the game at the age of 21. He first played for PSB Palestra São Bernado in Brazil before moving to Australia (where his sister lives) to play for South Melbourne FC, having seen them play at the 2000 FIFA Club World Championship. He joined the team for the 2005 Victorian Premier League season. In 2006, he left the club to undertake an unsuccessful 4-week trial at Greek Super League club Egaleo FC, after which he returned to Australia and played a vital role in securing the championship for South Melbourne as their highest scoring player (with a total of 12). He was signed by A-League club New Zealand Knights FC shortly after the championship victory on a short-term contract, for a fee of £90,000 (€100,000), that was extended several times, but did not feature in the Knights' line-up and was soon relegated to the bench. He returned to South Melbourne at the conclusion of the Knights' season and joined the squad for pre-season matches, eventually signing a new 2-year contract.

One of his most important goals for South Melbourne came during the 2010 Singapore Cup when his goal put South Melbourne 2-1 up against Thai Premier League champions Bangkok Glass, however it would not be enough, as Bangkok would ultimately tie 3-3 allowing them to go through on aggregate, knocking out South Melbourne in the process.

In January 2014, de Moraes officially retired from playing football.

Honours
With South Melbourne:
 Victorian Premier League Championship: 2006
 Hellenic Cup: 2007, 2009
 Theo Marmaras Medal: 2006, 2010
 Club Golden Boot: 2006, 2008, 2010

Individual
  Victorian Premier League player of the year: 2010
 Hummel F-League Golden Boot: 2013
 Jimmy Rooney Medal: 2006
 Theo Marmaras Medal: 2006, 2010

With North Melbourne Futsal Club:
 Futsal Oz V-League Premiership: 2011

With Vic Vipers Futsal Club:
 Hummel F-League Champions: 2013

References

1980 births
Living people
Footballers from São Paulo
Australian soccer players
Australian men's futsal players
Brazilian footballers
Brazilian emigrants to Australia
Brazilian men's futsal players
Brazilian expatriate footballers
New Zealand Knights FC players
South Melbourne FC players
A-League Men players
Expatriate association footballers in New Zealand
Australian people of Brazilian descent
Naturalised soccer players of Australia
Association football midfielders